Aston is a hamlet in Wrockwardine civil parish, Shropshire, England.

External links

Hamlets in Shropshire
Telford and Wrekin